The Özel Çevre Koruma Kurumu, is the Turkish authority for protecting Special Protection Areas. It was established in 1988 by a decree of the Turkish Cabinet and initially placed under direct supervision of the prime minister. In English it may be referred to as EPASA, short for Environmental Protection Agency for Special Areas.

History 
After publication in the Resmi Gazete the Turkish government obtained the authority to give environmentally threatened areas of high ecological value threatened the status of SEPA (Special Environmental Protection Area), so as to enable them to take special measures to safeguard their natural beauty for future generations. The practical administration was entrusted to the ÖÇKK. In 1991 the ÖÇKK was put under the responsibility of the newly formed Ministry of Environment. After a merger with the Ministry of Forestry in 2003, the Authority has to answer to the new Ministry of Environment and Forestry. The Turkish Authority for the Protection of Special Areas performs its activities as a public institution with a special budget.
In 2011 a new reorganisation has taken place resulting in three different branches, one for building and town planning, another specialised at water management and a third controlling forestry.

Mission 
The ÖÇKK aims to preserve the natural beauty, historical and cultural heritage, to protect the biodiversity and water, to preserve these values for future generations, promote sustainable regional development  and promote environmental awareness among the local population.

Goals 
Concretely this means that protection and exploitation of an SEPA go hand in hand, by
 protection of rural areas and forests
 prevention of water pollution
 conservation of the rare wetlands  
 improvement of the environmental infrastructure of the area's settlements  
 stimulation of economical sectors such as agriculture, tourism and fishery without interfering with the natural balance.

Registered Special Environmental Protection Areas (SEPA) 
 Belek
 Datça - Bozburun
 Gökova
 Gölbaşı
 Kaş - Kekova
 Pamukkale
 Tuz Gölü
 Foça
 Fethiye - Göcek
 Göksu Delta
 Ihlara
 Köyceğiz - Dalyan
 Patara
 Uzungöl

Criticism
Although environmental protection seems well-organised on paper, practice often shows otherwise. Economical growth often prevails over environmental interests. 
Rich agricultural soil is sacrificed for urbanisation. The urbanisation resulting from migration to areas with employment opportunities results in pollution of the surface water, soil erosion and environmental pollution because of the lack of water purifying installations and uncontrolled waste disposal.
To fulfill the EU admission standards, the Turkish environmental legislation is upgraded to international standards. 
Turkey has subscribed to Agenda 21 (1992) and tries to meet goals related to environment and sustainability. Items that need attention are water, (chemical) waste and energy supply.

References

External links
 Özel Çevre Koruma Korumu (English)
 milieuvraagstukken in Turkije, US Energy Information Administration

Environment of Turkey
Government of Turkey